Aulactinia is a genus of sea anemones in the family Actiniidae.

Species
Species in the genus include:
 Aulactinia capitata Agassiz in Verril, 1864
 Aulactinia incubans Dunn, Chia & Levine, 1980
 Aulactinia marplatensis (Zamponi, 1977)
 Aulactinia sinensis Li & Liu, 2012
 Aulactinia stella (Verrill, 1864)
 Aulactinia sulcata (Clubb, 1902)
 Aulactinia vancouverensis Sanamyan N., Sanamyan K. & McDaniel, 2013
 Aulactinia veratra (Drayton in Dana, 1846)
 Aulactinia verrucosa (Pennant, 1777)
 Aulactinia vladimiri Sanamyan N., Sanamyan K. & Bocharova, 2015

References

Actiniidae
Hexacorallia genera